The 1878 college football season had no clear-cut champion, with the Official NCAA Division I Football Records Book listing Princeton as having been selected national champions.

Conference and program changes

Conference standings

References